Mark Wroe (born 1969) is a British Anglican bishop. Since 2021, he has served as Bishop of Berwick. Previously, from 2018 to 2020, he was Archdeacon of Northumberland — both in the Church of England's Diocese of Newcastle.

Biography
Wroe studied theology, religious studies and classics at St Mary's Roman Catholic College Strawberry Hill (SIMMS) from 1989 to 1992 (now St Mary's University, Twickenham): the Degrees were awarded by Surrey University. He trained for ordained ministry at Ridley Hall, Cambridge, and was ordained in the Church of England as a deacon in 1996 and as a priest in 1997. He served his title at All Saints, Chilvers Coton with St Mary the Virgin in Nuneaton in Warwickshire between 1996 and 2000. He was then appointed priest-in-charge and subsequently vicar at St Alban's Church, Windy Nook in Tyne and Wear. From 2007 until 2018, he was priest-in-charge of St Barnabas and St Jude, and vicar of Holy Trinity, Jesmond in Newcastle. In 2017, he also became Area Dean of the Central Newcastle Deanery. In 2018, he became acting Archdeacon of Northumberland, being appointed to the position in 2019.

On 20 October 2020, it was announced that Wroe is to be consecrated a bishop in "early 2021", to serve as Bishop of Berwick, the suffragan bishop of the Diocese of Newcastle. He was duly consecrated on 5 January 2021, by Stephen Cottrell, Archbishop of York, at York Minster. On Christine Hardman's retirement, 30 November 2021, Wroe became acting diocesan Bishop of Newcastle (as sole suffragan bishop of the diocese).

References

1969 births
Living people
21st-century English Anglican priests
Alumni of the University of Surrey
Alumni of Anglia Ruskin University
Alumni of Ridley Hall, Cambridge
Clergy from Devon
Archdeacons of Northumberland
Bishops of Berwick